Zaratha macrocera is a moth of the family Agonoxenidae. It is found in Panama, Colombia and Brazil.

References

Moths described in 1875
Zaratha
Moths of Central America
Moths of South America